Timothy Strickland (born January 13, 1977) is a former Canadian Football League linebacker who played six seasons in the CFL for the Montreal Alouettes. He was an Eastern Division All-Star three times.

External links 
Just Sports Stats

1977 births
Living people
American players of Canadian football
Amsterdam Admirals players
Canadian football linebackers
Montreal Alouettes players
Ole Miss Rebels football players
People from Memphis, Tennessee